Music (typeset as MUSIC) is the third studio album from the band Girugamesh, released on November 5, 2008 in Japan and on 7 November in Europe. A limited and a regular edition were released, with different contents, as well as a European release featuring three extra tracks from their previously released, Japan-only EP Reason of Crying.

Track listing

Personnel
Satoshi – vocals
Nii – guitar
Shuu – bass guitar
Яyo – drums, programming

References

Girugamesh albums
2008 albums